Rafael Gerónimo Cayetano Izquierdo y Gutiérrez (30 September 1820 – 9 November 1883) was a Spanish Military Officer, politician, and statesman. He served as Governor-General of the Philippines from 4 April 1871 to 8 January 1873. He was famous for his use of "Iron Fist" type of government, contradicting the liberal government of his predecessor, Carlos María de la Torre y Navacerrada. He was the Governor-General during the 1872 Cavite mutiny which led to execution of 41 of the mutineers, including the Gomburza martyrs. Izquierdo also acted as Governor-General of Puerto Rico from March 1862 to April 1862.

Early life
Izquierdo was born on 30 September 1820 in Santander, Spain to Antonio Izquierdo del Monte and Antonia Gutiérrez de la Cámara. He was baptized Rafael Gerónimo Cayetano by Isidro Sánchez on the same day.

Entering as a cadet in the regiment of infantry of Gerona, Rafael Izquierdo reached the military rank of captain by the age of 17 when he participated in the First Carlist War in Navarre. At the start of the Second Carlist War which took place in Africa, Izquierdo was already a lieutenant colonel and at the end of the war brigadier general. He was then assigned to Lugo, Spain as military governor in 1861. The following year he was assigned as lieutenant-general to Puerto Rico before becoming an interim Governor-General when Rafael Echagüe y Bermingham vacated the position. Izquierdo then went back to Spain until in 1868 when he supported the revolution in Andalusia and was tasked as deputy for Malaga and Alicante in 1869 until 1871.

Philippine governorship

Replacing General Carlos María de la Torre on 4 April 1871, Rafael Izquierdo was installed as Governor-General of the Philippines. He is responsible for the opening of steamship and telegraph lines in the country.

He was also known to have promptly rescinded the liberal measures, thus implementing harsher laws, which ignited an uprising. The reformation suggested that the soldiers of the Engineering and Artillery Corps should pay taxes, from which they were previously exempt. Another drastic change was the requirement to perform manual labor. These changes eventually led to the 1872 Cavite mutiny, in which around 200 soldiers of the Engineering and Artillery Corps revolted and killed their officers. In retaliation, many liberals were implicated in the involvement of the conspiracy. The Spanish military court condemned the martyred priests, Fathers José Burgos, Mariano Gomez and Jacinto Zamora (GOMBURZA), to capital punishment by means of the garrote, on 17 February 1872. This uprising led to delays in rebuilding Malacañan Palace, and in turn almost transferred colonial governance back within the walls of Intramuros for security purposes. The plan to transfer the colonial government to Intramuros ended when Izquierdo fell ill and he stepped down from his position on 8 January 1873.

Rafael Izquierdo spent the remaining years of his life in Madrid, Spain, where he died in 1882.

See also
Philippine revolts against Spain
1872 Cavite mutiny
History of the Philippines (1521–1898)
Freedom of religion in the Philippines

Notes

References

1820 births
1883 deaths
People from Santander, Spain
Spanish generals
Captains General of the Philippines
Military personnel from Cantabria
Politicians from Cantabria